The National Evangelical School is a private school located in Homs, Syria. It was founded in 1855 
by American missionaries. It is owned now by the Presbyterian Evangelical Church in Homs which is a member of the National Evangelical Synod of Syria and Lebanon.

It is a kindergarten, primary, and secondary school that serves more than 2000 students, mixed and from all religions and sects.

History

In 1855 It was founded by American missionaries as an elementary school with national management at the church property in Bestan El Diwan
In 1905 It was developed nationally to a secondary school
In 1907 the buildings in Bab El Sbaa were constructed by national effort without the help of the Missionary, and Rev. Hanna Khabbaz was its principal.
In 1913 its graduates were accepted in the American University of Beirut for the first time without examination.
During World War I it was closed by the Ottoman Empire and became a military barracks.
After the independence of Syria, the school's name was changed from National College to The National Evangelical School.
In 1978 the modern school buildings for kindergarten were added.
In 1996 another floor was added.
In 2000 extension building was added to the primary section.

School names

The first name of the school was National College, it was also called Purity and Love.
People in Homs once called it the English School, because it was the only school that conducted classes in English. 
It was also known as the Red Cross Hospital, after the British army occupied it and set the cross at the top of its main building.
Then it became The National Evangelical School, as a sign of the Church's ownership.

Campus

The property of the school in Bab Al Sbaa is about 4,000 square meters. it includes 3 buildings each is two floors. Each section has its own courtyard or playground.

The school transports students using six busses it owns and more than 15 rented buses.

Awards

NES Swimming team: 
Third place in Homs Schools Swimming Tournament 2007-08
First place in The International School of Choueifat Tournament under 14
First Place in Homs Schools Swimming Tournament 2010:
First place in breast stroke 50m and 100m
second place in freestyle 50m
Third place in butterfly 50m
First place in the Medley

References

External links 
 National Evangelical Synod of Syria and Lebanon
 Beirut Evangelical School for Girls and Boys
 The National Evangelical School in Nabatieh
 The National Evangelical School

Schools in Syria
Educational institutions established in 1855
Education in Syria
Religious buildings and structures in Homs
1855 establishments in the Ottoman Empire